Airmail is an email client for iPhone and Mac OS X by Italian company Bloop SRL. It was based originally on the Sparrow client.

Macworld reviewed the application in 2013 and concluded that "Airmail is a great-looking email client, and does a few things quite well, but it has a few annoying quirks".

In July 2019, the company changed its licensing model, some features becoming available only to paid users of the application.

Awards 
In 2017, Airmail 3 was a winner in the annual Apple Design Awards.

References

Mobile software
Email clients